The Silver Anniversary Collection is a 2CD compilation by the English hard rock band Whitesnake, released in 2003. The album also features solo material by the bands leader/singer David Coverdale and material from his collaboration with Jimmy Page. The album is the 25th anniversary celebration for Whitesnake (hence the name "Silver").

Release
A single disc version also released in 2003 was simply titled Best of Whitesnake and charted at No. 44 on the UK Albums Chart.

In 2008 a similar compilation album was released, titled The 30th Anniversary Collection, which features three discs.

Track listing

Charts

References

Whitesnake compilation albums
2003 compilation albums
EMI Records compilation albums